The National Defense Education Act (NDEA) was signed into law on September 2, 1958, providing funding to United States education institutions at all levels.

NDEA was among many science initiatives implemented by President Dwight D. Eisenhower in 1958 to increase the technological sophistication and power of the United States alongside, for instance, DARPA and NASA. It followed a growing national sense that U.S. scientists were falling behind scientists in the Soviet Union. The early Soviet success in the Space Race catalyzed a national sense of unease with Soviet technological advances, especially after the Soviet Union launched the first-ever satellite, Sputnik, the previous year.

The act authorized funding for four years, increasing funding per year: for example, funding increased on eight program titles from $183 million in 1959 to $222 million in 1960. In total, over a billion dollars was directed towards improving American science curricula. However, in the aftermath of McCarthyism, a mandate was inserted in the act that all beneficiaries must complete an affidavit disclaiming belief in the overthrow of the U.S. government. This requisite loyalty statement stirred concern and protest from the American Association of University Professors and over 153 institutions.

Cause and purpose
The NDEA was influenced by the Soviet launch of the satellite Sputnik on October 4, 1957. U.S. citizens feared that education in the USSR was superior to that in the United States, and Congress reacted by adding the act to bring U.S. schools up to speed.

The year 1957 also coincided with an acute shortage of mathematicians in the United States. The electronic computer created a demand for mathematicians as programmers and it also shortened the lead time between the development of a new mathematical theory and its practical application, thereby making their work more valuable. The United States could no longer rely on European refugees for all of its mathematicians, though they remained an important source, so it had to drastically increase the domestic supply. At the time, "mathematics" was interpreted as pure mathematics rather than applied mathematics. The problem in the 1950s and 1960s was that industry, including defense, was absorbing the mathematicians who were also needed at high schools and universities training the next generation. At the university level, even more recently, there have been years when it was difficult to hire applied mathematicians and computer scientists because of the rate that industry was absorbing them.

Additionally, more high school graduates were beginning to attend college. In 1940 about one-half million Americans attended college, which was about 15 percent of their age group. By 1960, however, college enrollments had expanded to 3.6 million. By 1970, 7.5 million students were attending colleges in the United States, or 40 percent of college-age youths.

The act, therefore, was designed to fulfill two purposes. First, it was designed to provide the country with specific defense oriented personnel. This included providing federal help to foreign language scholars, area studies centers, and engineering students. Second it provided financial assistance—primarily through the National Defense Student Loan program—for thousands of students who would be part of the growing numbers enrolling at colleges and universities in the 1960s.

NDEA established the National Defense Student Loan (NDSL) program to provide low-interest federal loans to "promising, yet needy students", and to enable them to pursue undergraduate and graduate educations.  The national defense student loans were especially targeted toward students who possessed superior capacity in mathematics, engineering, or a modern foreign language or who desired to teach in elementary or secondary schools. A further intention of this loan program was to stimulate and assist in the establishment of loan programs at institutions of higher education through the provision of NDSL loans. The NDEA spurred the creation of federal and university funded college loan programs that still exist today.

The 1959 Disney featurette Donald in Mathmagic Land was produced and distributed with NDEA funding.

Breakdown by title

Title I

Title I of the NDEA serves as an introduction to the content and purposes of the Act.

Title II

Title II authorizes the provision of student loans and provides terms by which they may be awarded. Initially, Title II provided scholarships (also known as grants) rather than loans. However, some members of Congress expressed worry about the message sent by giving students a "free ride." The House version of the bill eliminated scholarship money, while the Senate reduced the amount of scholarship money. By the time the bill was passed into law, student aid was exclusively loan-based.

Title III

Title III provides additional financial assistance for the purposes of strengthening science, math, and foreign language programs. Latin and Greek programs are not funded under this title, on the grounds that they are not modern foreign languages, and thus do not support defense needs. Title III provides equipment, materials and state matching funds to develop mathematics, science, and foreign language instruction and professional development. Title III also encouraged cooperation between teachers and researchers. During Title III, research shifted the homogenous definition of intelligence associated with gifted children.

Title IV

Title IV provides funding for graduate fellowships in order to increase the number of graduate-level professionals and university professors. Priority was given to students who stated an interest in becoming a professor. However, certain fields (such as folklore) were specifically exempted from these fellowships. Title IV was also one of the only two federal programs (along with Title VI of the NDEA) in existence at the time that gave any funding to the humanities.

Title V

Title V includes provisions for the training of guidance counselors and the implementation of testing programs to identify gifted students. This laid the groundwork for Academically Gifted (AG) and Gifted & Talented (GT) programs and began the trend of using standardized testing in schools to measure competency. Title V had a great influence on gifted education. However, since the program started in the 1920s, the defining percentage that marks "giftedness" has remained constant.

Title VI

Title VI provides funding for language and area studies programs. "Area studies" includes such subjects as African American studies and Latin American studies.

Title VII

Title VII provided funding for research in the more effective use of technology for educational purposes.

Title VIII

Title VIII provided funding for vocational training in order to better prepare citizens for the workforce.

Title IX

Title IX established the Science Information Institute and Science Information Council in order to disseminate scientific information and assist the government in matters of a highly technical nature.

Title X

Title X contains miscellaneous provisions regarding legal and pragmatic details of the Act.

Controversy
The NDEA includes Title X, Section 1001 (f), a mandate that all beneficiaries of the act complete an affidavit disclaiming belief in the overthrow of the U.S. government. Some in higher education opposed the disclaimer affidavit, as it came to be called, because they said it attempted to control beliefs and as such violated academic freedom. Initially, a small number of institutions (Barnard, Yale, and Princeton) refused to accept funding under the student loan program established by the act because of the affidavit requirement. By 1962, when the disclaimer affidavit was repealed, the number of schools protesting the clause was 153.

After four years of seemingly ineffective protest, the disclaimer requirement was repealed in the Fall of 1962 by President John F. Kennedy who was spurred by an incident extraneous to universities' protests. In particular, following the public disclosure of the case of a National Science Foundation Fellowship recipient who had run into trouble with the House Un-American Activities Committee, and had been convicted of contempt of Congress. Kennedy interpreted  this case proved the affidavit clause to be ineffective, and, in spite of—rather than because of—protest prior to 1961, the disclaimer requirement was excised.

Footnotes

References
 Barksdale Clowse, Barbara. Brainpower For The Cold War: The Sputnik Crisis and National Defense Education Act of 1958" (Greenwood Press; 1981) 225 pages
 Copy of the original National Defense Education Act (P.L. 85-864; 72 Stat. 1580), History of Federal Education Policy website
"National Defense Education Act", Infoplease.com. Sandbox Networks, Inc.

 Urban, Wayne J. More Than Science and Sputnik: The National Defense Education Act of 1958'' (University of Alabama Press; 2010) 247 pages

1958 in American law
85th United States Congress
United States federal education legislation
1958 in education